Theoxena was the daughter of prince Herodicus, a well-respected person of Thessaly and one of their main leaders.

Theoxena may also refer to:

 Theoxena of Syracuse (born before 317 BC; died after 289 BC), a Greek Macedonian noblewoman
 Theoxena of Egypt (fl. 4th/3rd century BC), a Syracusan princess, daughter of Theoxena of Syracuse
 Theoxena (moth), a genus of moths

See also
 Theoxenia, a theme in Greek mythology demonstrating the importance of hospitality